FivePoint Amphitheatre is an amphitheatre at the Orange County Great Park in Irvine, California. It opened in 2017 as a replacement for the defunct Irvine Meadows Amphitheatre. With 6,500 bleacher seats, 280 VIP seats, and an approximate 5,500 standing room spaces, it is the largest amphitheatre in Orange County by overall capacity and second-largest in seated capacity, only behind the Pacific Amphitheatre in Costa Mesa. The site is owned by real estate development group FivePoint and operated by Los Angeles-based concert promoter Live Nation. The current facility consists of three temporary bleacher sections and a temporary stage with future plans to establish a more permanent amphitheatre on the Great Park premises.

Since its opening in October 2017, FivePoint Amphitheatre has served as one of Orange County's major outdoor concert venues with many musicians, bands, and performers making tour stops there.

History
The current site of the Orange County Great Park originated as Marine Corps Air Station (MCAS) El Toro, a military air base that operated from 1942 to 1999. In 2016, the Irvine Company decided not to renew Live Nation's lease at the Irvine Meadows Amphitheatre, meaning that the 35-year-old venue would permanently close and face demolition to make way for housing developments. In early 2017, Live Nation partnered with Great Park developer FivePoint to establish a temporary venue on its property by the end of the year. A site was selected for development near the end of the former MCAS El Toro runway 34L. On March 14, the Irvine city council unanimously approved the project. The amphitheatre was originally scheduled to open on August 26 with local bands Young the Giant and Cold War Kids, but the inaugural concert was postponed to October 5. The concert went on as planned on October 5, officially opening the venue.

References

Amphitheaters in California
Music venues in California
Buildings and structures in Orange County, California
Tourist attractions in Irvine, California
Music venues completed in 2017
Buildings and structures in Irvine, California